This is the list of rolling stock of the Chemins de Fer Luxembourgeois (CFL). In October 2010, CFL ordered eight double-deck EMUs from Stadler Rail; these will enter join CFL in 2014.

Current fleet

Electric

Diesel

Past fleet

Diesel Shunters

Diesel Locos

On Track Plant

References

Rolling stock of Luxembourg